Bartow Historic District, in Bartow, Georgia is a historic district which was listed on the National Register of Historic Places.  The district included 121 contributing buildings, three contributing structures, and a contributing site.  Its   area is roughly centered along Church St. (U.S. Highway 221), Wadley Road (U.S. Highway 319) and the CSX rail line.

It includes a variety of architectural styles, including Queen Anne, folk vernacular, Colonial Revival, and bungalow/Craftsman.

Selected buildings included are:
Central of Georgia depot (1859), brick.
Smith-Evans House (c.1916), 7261 Church Street - two-story house with monumental two-story front portico, with a heavy entablature, supported by six fluted Doric columns. Has a porte cochere.
Bartow Bank (1906), one-story commercial with "marble-clad front facade with bands of light and dark marble on the cornice and decorative pink marble details", as well as "an elaborate balustrade-like parapet." The Bartow Bank opened in 1902 as Bartow's first bank; it failed in the 1920s as the cotton economy collapsed (with boll weevil infestations).

References

External links
 

Historic districts on the National Register of Historic Places in Georgia (U.S. state)
National Register of Historic Places in Jefferson County, Georgia
Queen Anne architecture in Georgia (U.S. state)
Colonial Revival architecture in Georgia (U.S. state)
Buildings and structures completed in 1887